Chengdu University of Technology (CDUT) is a national public research university located in Chengdu, Sichuan, China. It is a technology-focused institution co-funded by the Ministry of Education of China, the Ministry of Natural Resources of China, and the Sichuan Provincial Government.CDUT was established in 1956 on the basis of geology-related faculties from Chongqing University, Nanjing University, Northwest University, Beijing Institute of Geology (now China University of Geosciences), Northeast College of Geology (now Jilin University), and Jiao Tong University. The university is included in the Double First Class University Plan designed by the central government of China, and approved as a Chinese state Double First Class University.

The university covers an area of 1.92 square kilometers. There are 18 colleges, 1 Institute of Sedimentary Geology, and 1 Institute of Geological Survey. As of 2022, the university offers 75 undergraduate majors and more than 100 master's and doctoral programs, with 3,821 teaching and research staff.

About CDUT

History 
Chengdu Institute of Geology, the predecessor of Chengdu University of Technology, was founded in 1956, based on the combination of geology-related faculties of Chongqing University, Nanjing University, Northwest University, former Beijing Institute of Geology (China University of Geosciences), former Northeast College of Geology (Jilin University), former Jiaotong University, etc., with the approval of the State Council of the People's Republic of China.

In 1993, Chengdu Institute of Geology renamed to Chengdu Institute of Technology. Chengdu Institute of Technology (Chengdu Institute of Geology) was a key university under the administration of the Ministry of Land and Resources of China (now the Ministry of Natural Resources of China). 

In 2001, Chengdu Institute of Technology amalgamated with two provincial colleges and formed Chengdu University of Technology (CDUT). It is a state key university jointly-administered by the Ministry of Education of China, the Ministry of Natural Resources of China, and the Provincial Government of Sichuan. CDUT is included in the Chinese state Double First Class University Plan and approved as a Double First Class University.

Campus and Location
CDUT is located in Central Chengdu, at the heart of Chenghua District. The main campus occupies an area of approximately 1.92 km2. The campus is served by the Chengdu University of Technology Station on the Line 7 and Line 8 of Chengdu Metro.

International Cooperation and Exchange 
In recent years, CDUT has invited Nobel Prize laureates and a large number of world-renowned experts and scholars to give lectures. The university recruits foreign experts to set up courses for undergraduates and postgraduate students on a regular basis and bring them into the talent training system.

CDUT began to carry out in-depth cooperation with several British universities in 2005, and it is one of the earliest universities in China to set up Sino-foreign dual-degree education programs. In 2013, Chengdu University of Technology and the University of Edinburgh signed a memorandum of cooperation in education. The two universities carry out the '2+2' dual-degree education program in several undergraduate majors, including Geology, Geology and Physical Geography, Geophysics, Geophysics and Meteorology, Geophysics and Geology, Environmental Geoscience, etc. Students study in Chengdu University of Technology for the first two years of undergraduate courses, and then go to the University of Edinburgh for further studies. After completing the rest two years of undergraduate courses, the students can obtain graduation certificate and degree from Chengdu University of Technology and degree from the University of Edinburgh.

National Key Disciplines 
CDUT is one of a limited number of universities with both first-level and second-level national key disciplines in China. In 1988, when the first batch of National Key Disciplines were appraised and reviewed, CDUT's two disciplines were rated as first National Key Disciplines. After the merges and restructures of disciplines made by the Chinese Ministry of Education in the following years, the university has 1 first-level National Key Discipline (Geological Resources and Geological Engineering) and 4 second-level National Key Disciplines by 2008.

University structure

Faculties & Colleges
Business School

College of Communication Science & Art

College of Computer & Cyber Security (Oxford Brookes College of CDUT)

College of Earth Physics

College of Earth Sciences

College of Ecology & Environment

College of Energy Sciences

College of Environment & Civil Engineering

College of Humanities & Law

College of Materials, Chemistry & Chemical Engineering

College of Mathematics & Physics

College of Management Sciences

College of Nuclear Technology & Automatic Engineering

College of Physical Sciences

College of Tourism & Urban-Rural Planning

School of Marxism

School of Mechanical & Electrical Engineering

Students & Teaching Staff
Approximately 36,000 students are enrolled in the year 2021. In 2022, the teaching and administrative staff number of the university is 3,821, including 4 fellows of Chinese Academy of Science, 439 professors and 774 associate professors. 

CDUT has international cooperative relationships and exchanges with more than 60 universities and institutions outside China. More than 2,800 scholars and experts from over 40 countries have visited CDUT to conduct research or to lecture. Students from the United States, Australia, Germany, Austria, Korea, Japan, Russia and other countries have studied at CDUT in different fields. Over 300 international cooperative research projects have been completed. In recent years, the university has successfully held several international academic conferences.

Museum
The CDUT museum, with more than 100,000 specimens, is one of the largest natural museums in West China. Many world and national class treasures are on display. Among these treasures, the 22 meter long Mamenchisaurus hochuanensis, the world's longest-necked Jurassic dinosaur, is the highlight of the museum. Another notable treasure is the Chungkingichthys tachuenses, a rare complete fish fossil. The new landmark CDUT Museum, connected with the Shilidian Station of Chengdu Metro Line 8, opened in September 2022.

Library & Archive 
The CDUT library holds 2,756,000 paper volumes, 2,597,000 electronic books, and over 48,000 electronic-journals. Additionally, the library has subscribed to 90 well-known databases including SCI, Elsevier, CNKI, etc. CDUT's East Library has been opened since 2016, providing additional 6000 seats. The CDUT Archive is one of the first-grade archives in China's research institutions and universities, and one of the largest archives in Sichuan Province.

Scientific Research
As an important national base for scientific research and high-level talent cultivation, CDUT undertakes a large number of important projects including national major research and development programs, national major science and technology projects, national science and technology support plan projects, national natural science fund projects, national '863 programs' , national '973 programs', national social science foundation projects, national geological surveys and so on.

By 2020, CDUT has received a total of 954 national, provincial and ministerial science and technology awards, including 1 Grand Prize of the National Science and Technology Progress Award, 4 First Prizes of the National Science and Technology Progress Award, 1 China International Science and Technology Cooperation Award, 1 Second Prize of the National Natural Science Award, 9 Second Prizes of the National Science and Technology Progress Award, 1 China Patent Award, 9 National Technological Invention Awards and Third Prizes of the National Science and Technology Progress Award. Nearly 926 provincial government awards and social force awards have been awarded, and more than 1920 patents have been granted. The university participates in the key national projects including west-to-east power transmission, west–east gas transmission, south-to-north water diversion, Sichuan-Tibet railway, oil and gas geological exploration, energy development, large-scale hydropower station, regional and urban environment protection, as well as other national large-scale transportation infrastructure projects.

State Key Laboratories

State Key Laboratory of Oil and Gas Reservoir Geology and Exploitation 
The State Key Laboratory of Reservoir Geology and Exploitation is the only state key laboratory in the petroleum industry in China, with 43 permanent researchers in the CDUT division. The research directions mainly include: 1) comprehensive study of oil and gas reservoirs (reservoir geology); 2) dynamics of petroliferous basins and potential analysis of oil and gas resources; 3) theories and methods of geophysical exploration of complex oil and gas reservoirs.

Based on the national key discipline of Mineral Survey and Exploration of CDUT, the State Key Laboratory of Reservoir Geology and Exploitation of CDUT covers two first-level doctoral programs of 'Geological Resources and Geological Engineering' and 'Geology'. Including 9 doctoral programs: 'Mineralogy, Petrology, Mineralogy', 'Paleontology and Stratigraphy', 'Structural Geology', 'Sedimentology', 'Mineral Survey and Exploration', 'Earth Exploration and Information Technology', 'Applied Geophysics', 'Oil and Gas Field Development Geology', 'Oil and Gas Field Development Engineering'. It also has postdoctoral stations for the first-level disciplines of 'Geological Resources and Geological Engineering' and 'Geology'. The laboratory is an important base for high-level scientific research, academic exchanges and training of high-level talents in the field of oil and gas reservoir geology and engineering in China.

The State Key Laboratory of Oil and Gas Reservoir Geology and Exploitation of CDUT relies on 'Petroleum Geology and Exploration', the national key discipline, and 'Geology', one of the first 'World First Class disciplines' identified by the Ministry of Education. Through more than 60 years of accumulation, three stable research directions have been formed: 1) petroliferous basin dynamics and oil and gas accumulation theory; 2) oil and gas reservoir geology theory and evaluation technology; 3) geophysical prediction methods and techniques for complex oil and gas reservoirs. In recent years, combined with the needs of national energy strategy and the frontier development, new directions have been developed, including geological-engineering integration of oil & gas reservoirs and equipment, geothermal resources evaluation and development, etc.

State Key Laboratory of Geohazard Prevention and Geoenvironment Protection 
The State Key Laboratory of Geo-hazard Prevention and Geo-environment Protection (SKLGP) was established on the basis of the College of Environment and Civil Engineering of CDUT and the National Key Specialty Lab of Geological Engineering of CDUT (funded by the Ministry of Education of China). The SKLGP provides master and doctoral degree programs and runs a postdoctoral research station.

Based on the national key discipline of Geological Engineering of CDUT, the SKLGP has been taking advantage of the strong geoscience strength and conducting frontier scientific research. The laboratory has four main research directions: 1) evaluation and prevention for major geological disasters; 2) corresponding mechanism between human activities and geological environment, and disaster control;  3) regional geological environment evaluation and protection; 4) geological hazard monitoring, early warning and information technology.

During the past decade, the SKLGP has undertaken nearly 1,500 national, provincial and ministerial research projects, solving a series of theoretical and technical issues in the fields of prevention & control of geological disasters and construction of major projects. The scientific research involves many fields, including geological environmental protection and geological disaster prevention, water conservancy and hydropower development, highway, railway and airport construction, subway and high-rise building development, etc. The SKLGP's scientific research achievements included winning 3 First Prizes of National Scientific & Technological Progress Awards, 6 Second Prizes of National Scientific & Technological Progress Awards, 1 International Scientific & Technological Cooperation Award, 1 National Patent Gold Award, and more than 60 ministerial and provincial awards. Additionally, the laboratory has published more than 105 monographs & teaching materials and more than 5,000 papers both domestically and internationally, and obtained nearly 500 authorized invention patents.

There are 87 permanent staff in the laboratory, including 70 permanent researchers and 17 technical and managerial staff. Among the researchers, 44 of whom are professors (researchers), 37 are doctoral supervisors, and 98.6% of the staff have doctoral degrees.

The SKLGP has 7 research divisions and centers and 9 well-equipped testing labs, playing a vital role in national scientific research and high-level talent training. The SKLGP also lays emphasis on the cultivation of students, with over 30 postdoctoral researchers, 250 PhD students and 1800 graduate students graduated from the SKLGP. For the opening up and cooperation, there is an open fund set up in the laboratory, subsidizing 15 to 20 open projects annually, in order to attract more talents from home and abroad to work in the SKLGP. Besides, international communication and cooperation is always priority. SKLGP has established long-term and stable academic relationships with the universities and research institutions from US, UK, Netherlands, Italy, France, Japan, South Africa, Hong Kong, Taiwan, etc. Additionally, the SKLGP has organized many international academic conferences.

Culture

Motto 
Seeking Truth, Seeking Triumph (穷究于理，成就于工)

School Song 
砚湖泱泱，慧园苍苍，

这里是放飞理想的地方。

穷究于理，成就于工，

我们永远铭记心上。

五洲四海，弦歌一堂，

厚德博学，桃李芬芳，

峨眉巍巍，岷江沧沧，

我们是社会的栋梁.

Notable alumni 

 Huang Runqiu (黄润秋) - Minister of Ministry of Ecology and Environment of P.R.China
 Hu Changsheng (胡昌升) - Secretary of the CPC Committee of Gansu Province
 Wang Shijie (王世杰) - Vice Governor of Guizhou Province
 Xu Dachun (许大纯) - Committee Member & Director of Political Department of General Administration of Customs of China
 Liu Baojun (刘宝珺) - Fellow of Chinese Academy of Sciences
 Hu Ruizhong (胡瑞忠) -  Fellow of Chinese Academy of Sciences, Director of Institute of Geochemistry
 Zhou Yuan (周源) - Founder & CEO of Zhihu Inc. (NYSE: ZH, SEHK: 2390)
 Feng Yong (冯勇) - Chairman of the Supervisory Committee of Dongfang Electrics Corporation Ltd. (1072.HK, 600875 CH)
 Daqing Wan (万大庆) - Mathematician, Morningside Silver Medal of Mathematics winner

References

External links
 Chengdu University of Technology
 3D map

 
Universities and colleges in Chengdu
Technical universities and colleges in China